Christopher Stone (c. 1556 – June 1614), of Bath, Somerset, was an English politician.

He was a Member (MP) of the Parliament of England for Bath in 1604. He was Mayor of Bath in 1604–05.

References

1550s births
1614 deaths
English MPs 1604–1611
Mayors of Bath, Somerset